Violet Augusta Roche  (1885–1967) was born in Te Awamutu, New Zealand, in 1885. She was a welfare worker and journalist who wrote numerous articles between 1935 and 1950 for Walkabout.

She is credited with reviving and sustaining the New Zealand branch of the Barnardo’s children's charity for many years. In the 1964 New Year Honours, Roche was appointed a Member of the Order of the British Empire, for services to the community, especially in connection with Dr Barbado's Homes.

References

1885 births
1967 deaths
People from Te Awamutu
20th-century New Zealand women writers
20th-century New Zealand writers
New Zealand Members of the Order of the British Empire
20th-century New Zealand journalists